Dave Dallas is an American football coach and former player.  He was the head football coach at Kansas Wesleyan University until he resigned after completion of the 2013 season. From 1989 to 1996, Dallas was the head football coach at Ottawa University. From 2014 to 2016 he was the head coach at North County High School in Bonne Terre, Missouri.

Playing career
Dallas played college football at Missouri Western in St. Joseph, Missouri from 1979 until 1982.  After playing, he continued to work with the Griffons as a graduate assistant in the football program.

Coaching career

Ottawa 
Dallas was the 25th head football coach at Ottawa University in Ottawa, Kansas and he held that position for eight seasons, from 1989 until 1996.

Kansas Wesleyan
After coaching at Ottawa, Dallas became the 19th head football coach at the Kansas Wesleyan University in Salina, Kansas.  He held that position for 17 seasons from 1997 until his resignation in 2013.

In 2000, he coached the Coyotes in the American Family Charity Bowl against conference rival Bethany, losing 20–3.  His 2001 team was declared Kansas Collegiate Athletic Conference co-champions and then the team won the title outright in 2002.  For both the 2001 and 2002 seasons, Kansas Wesleyan qualified for the NAIA Football National Championship playoffs.

Head coaching record

College

References

External links
 Kansas Wesleyan profile

Year of birth missing (living people)
Living people
Graceland Yellowjackets football coaches
Kansas Wesleyan Coyotes football coaches
Missouri Western Griffons football coaches
Missouri Western Griffons football players
Ottawa Braves football coaches
Truman Bulldogs football coaches
High school football coaches in Missouri